Pie melon may refer to:

 Cucurbita ficifolia
 Watermelon